Heather Kerr (born 3 September 1991) is an English rugby union player. She debuted for England at the 2015 Women's Six Nations Championship against Ireland. She was named in the 2017 Women's Rugby World Cup squad for England.

Whiile attending Durham University Kerr was persuaded to try rugby out, before 2012 she had never played rugby but made her international debut less than three years later. She holds a BSc degree in Geography and MSc in Risk and Environmental Hazards from Durham (St Mary's College) and completed a Doctorate in Civil Engineering at the same institution in 2019.

References

External links 
 RFU Player Profile

1991 births
Living people
Alumni of St Mary's College, Durham
England women's international rugby union players
English female rugby union players
Rugby union players from Ealing